Nu-En-Jin is a 2002 album by Christian industrial band Mortal, and was recorded by the band after a six-year hiatus.

Track listing
tenn0  (4:39)
Mr Ar0chet  (3:46)
Dymenshan [KR-Krik-P0p!]  (4:05)
muj0 [Uncertainty mx] (4:56)
Vilan Corp  [Spy mx] (3:39)
FMZ4  (3:59)
fl0ranclaude  (4:47)
Teraferma  (3:54)
cl0udburst  (5:40)
myth0 ex [Green Edit]  (4:49)
the W0rd is alive [Jer0mix]  (4:50)

Personnel
Jyro Xhan
Jerome Fontamillas - Engineer, Programming, Vocals
Joe Anderson - Guitar
Joey Belville - Cut, Editing, Mixing, Vocals
Jon Foreman - Vocals
Joe Marchiano - Drums

References

2002 albums
Mortal (band) albums